Hospital del Este is a Panama Metro station on Line 2. It was opened on 25 April 2019 as part of the inaugural section of Line 2 between San Miguelito and Nuevo Tocumen. This is an elevated station built above the Pan-American Highway, locally known as Corredor Sur. The station is located between Las Mañanitas and Altos de Tocumen.

References

Panama Metro stations
2019 establishments in Panama
Railway stations opened in 2019